Forever Underground is the third album by the US death metal band Vital Remains. It was released in 1997 by Osmose Productions. The first album to feature guitarist Dave Suzuki and the only one to feature bassist Joe Lewis on vocals. It is extremely rare, as only about 1000 copies were made.

Track listing 
All Songs Written By Vital Remains, except where noted.

Personnel
Joseph "Joe" Lewis - Vocals, Bass
Tony Lazaro - Rhythm Guitar
Dave Suzuki - Drums, Lead Guitar

Vital Remains albums
1997 albums